Osmancıklı (or Amasyalı) Koca Mehmed Nizamüddin Pasha (died 1439) was an Ottoman statesman who served as grand vizier of the Ottoman Empire from 1429 to 1438.

He settled in Osmancık after his service as grand vizier and died there in 1439. He was the son of Imamzade Halil Pasha, who also served as grand vizier.

See also 
 List of Ottoman Grand Viziers

References 

15th-century Grand Viziers of the Ottoman Empire
Turks from the Ottoman Empire
1439 deaths
People from Osmancık